The 2009 California wildfires were a series of 9,159 wildfires that were active in the US state of California, during the year 2009. The wildfires also caused at least US$134.48 million in damage. Although the fires burned many different regions of California in August, the month was especially notable for several very large fires which burned in Southern California, despite being outside of the normal fire season for that region.

The Station Fire, north of Los Angeles, was the largest and deadliest of these wildfires. A state of emergency was also declared for the  Lockheed Fire in Santa Cruz County, to the north.

Fires 
Below is a list of all fires that exceeded  during the 2009 fire season. The list is taken from CAL FIRE's list of large fires.

Weather conditions

Invasive, non-native vegetation dies and re-sprouts year after year creating an unnatural buildup of dead plant material.  While periodic fires are natural, and many native plants depend upon fire to reproduce; the intensity and frequency of these fires is altered by the presence of non-natives.

In Southern California, the normal wildfire season begins in October, with the arrival of the infamous Santa Ana winds, and it is unusual to see fires spread so rapidly during other times of year. However, temperatures throughout the southern part of the state exceeded 100 °F (38 °C) for much of late August. The combination of high temperatures, low humidity and a large quantity of tinder-dry fuel, some of which had not burnt for decades, allowed some of the normal fires to quickly explode out of control despite the lack of winds to spread the flames. These conditions, along with extreme terrain in many undeveloped areas that slowed access to burn areas, made firefighting difficult.

Notable fires

Dozens of fires burned throughout California in August 2009. Some of the most notable are listed here.

Northern California

Alameda County
The Corral Fire began on August 13 along Corral Hollow Road, outside the Carnegie State Vehicular Recreation Area, near Tracy in Alameda County. It burned  of dry grass before being fully contained on August 16.

Mariposa County

The Big Meadow Fire began on August 26 in Big Meadow, two miles (3 km) east of El Portal, just inside Yosemite National Park. As of September 4, this fire has burned  in the Mariposa County section of Yosemite, resulting in the closure of several trails, campgrounds and the portion of State Highway 120 known as Tioga Road. The community of Foresta was evacuated but residents were allowed to return on September 4. The Big Meadow Fire is 96% contained as of September 6, with full containment expected by September 10. This blaze was the result of a prescribed burn gone out of control, leading some to question the judgment of Park authorities.

Placer County
 The Mammoth Fire started on July 16 and burned  in the American River Canyon and Mammoth Bar Recreation Area east of Auburn before it was contained on July 18. The fire closed the Foresthill Bridge, the highest bridge in California, for 2 days. It took 358 firefighters, 24 engines, and a helicopter to put out. The cause was undetermined as of July 18, 2009.
 The Foresthill Fire started on August 27 and burned  along the American River Canyon near the Foresthill Bridge before it was contained on August 28. This fire is close to the location of the Mammoth Fire. The fire took over 100 firefighters, 10 engines, 3 airtankers (planes), and 2 helicopters to extinguish. The cause was undetermined as of August 28, 2009.
 The 49 Fire was a small but very destructive fire that began on August 30 and was fully contained by CalFire on September 1. Although it burned only , it destroyed 63 homes and 3 commercial structures in the unincorporated area of North Auburn in Placer County. The fire extensively damaged 3 more homes and 6 more businesses. The fire began along the east side of Highway 49, which led to the name 49 Fire. The fire quickly spread north and east. The fire spread so quickly that some residents barely escaped their burning homes. Auburn Municipal Airport was closed during the fire, which burned right up to the runway. The fire's cause is arson. The arsonist lit a second fire just east of the original fire 20 minutes after the first fire. This added to the destruction and fire spread. This was the second fire to burn the area in 5 years.

Santa Cruz/Monterey/San Benito Counties
The Lockheed Fire began on August 12 near the Lockheed Martin Space Systems campus in Santa Cruz County. A total of  burned and thirteen structures were destroyed, including four seasonal cabins but no primary residences. No cause has been identified. The communities of Swanton and Bonny Doon were evacuated and a state of emergency was declared by Lieutenant Governor John Garamendi on August 14. Many hillsides burned by the Lockheed Fire had not burned since 1948 due to active fire suppression in the area. Some plant species endemic to the area, including the endangered Santa Cruz manzanita, propagate only after fire, potentially allowing these rare species to proliferate for the first time in decades.
The Bryson Fire started from a mobile home fire on Bryson-Hesperia Road in the Monterey County town of Lockwood. It burned  and five structures, including three homes, between August 26 and August 28.
The Gloria Fire began on August 27 along Camphora Gloria Road near the town of Soledad. It burned  in Monterey and San Benito counties, destroying a house and another structure before CalFire contained it on August 31 at a cost of US$4 million. The fire was set off by fireworks used to scare away birds outside of a winery and a criminal investigation is underway to determine who is responsible.
The Loma Fire (October 25–27),  (initially reported as 600 acres) began near Loma Prieta Way in Santa Clara County and spread to the Santa Cruz County area of Maymens Flat – Highland Road, Eureka Canyon and Ormsby. One residence destroyed with 160 structures threatened and evacuations in place for north Ormsby Cutoff until October 26.  1,742 firefighters with 4 injuries reported; cost $2.7 million.  High winds contributed to the spread in the Summit area of the Santa Cruz Mountains in an area which had  of rain on October 13.

Yuba County
The Yuba Fire was started after a red-tailed hawk flew into a power line on August 14, and burned  before being contained on August 21 at a cost of US$12.1 million. Two residences in Yuba County burned and power lines transporting electricity from a hydroelectric facility were threatened.

Southern California

Los Angeles County

The Morris Fire (August 25 – September 3) began near Morris Dam in the Angeles National Forest. This fire is thought to have been caused by arson.
The Station Fire (August 26 – October 16, 209 structures destroyed, including 89 homes) started in the Angeles National Forest near the U.S. Forest Service ranger station on the Angeles Crest Highway (State Highway 2). Two firefighters, Captain Tedmund Hall and Firefighter Specialist Arnie Quinones  were killed on August 30 while attempting to escape the flames when their fire truck plunged off a cliff.

San Bernardino County
The Sheep Fire (October 3–10) started near Sheep Canyon Road near Lytle Creek east of Mount Baldy and west of the Cajon Pass in the San Gabriel Mountains. Five structures had been destroyed in the Lone Pine and Swarthout Canyon areas including one residence. Eight firefighters have been injured but no fatalities have been reported. Below-freezing temperatures in the mountain areas helped fire crews in containment on October 6. Suppression costs : $7,977,000.

Santa Barbara County
The Jesusita Fire was a wildfire that began at approximately 1:45 PM on May 5, 2009, in the hills of Santa Barbara, California. The fire burned , destroyed 80 homes and damaged 15 more before being 100% contained.
The La Brea Fire began near La Brea Creek in Santa Barbara County, inside of Los Padres National Forest. The fire burned  of chaparral between August 8 and August 22, but only destroyed two structures—a cabin and an unused ranger station.

Ventura County
 The Guiberson Fire in Ventura County has burnt an estimated , destroying two outbuildings and injuring two firefighters. Governor Schwarzenegger declared a state of emergency. The fire, which started between Fillmore and Moorpark, has caused the evacuation of almost 600 homes in Meridian Hills and Bardsdale; about 1,000 structures were threatened, in addition to oil pipelines in the area. The cause of the fire is still unknown.

References

External links

 Current Fire Information . CAL FIRE (California Department of Forestry and Fire Protection)
 California fires, August 31, 2009. NOAA satellite image of Angeles National Forest (Station Fire), Big Meadow fire (northern California), and Mill Flat fire (Utah). Retrieved August 31, 2009. Higher res image 1280 x 1024
 West coast wildfire smoke covering US Plains and Great Lakes states, 9/3/2009. NOAA satellite image. Retrieved September 7, 2009.  Higher res image 1280 x 1024

 
California, 2009
Wildfires in California by year